David Zeferino Malembana (born 11 October 1995) is a professional footballer who plays as a centre-back for Bulgarian First League club Lokomotiv Sofia. Born in Germany, he represents the Mozambique national team.

Formerly of Dynamo Dresden II and Goslarer SC 08, he spent three seasons with Berliner FC Dynamo, before joining Lokomotiv Plovdiv in 2019.

Club career
Malembana began his career at Dynamo Dresden II in 2013 and moved to Goslarer SC 08 two years later. In 2016 he joined Berliner FC Dynamo, where he made 56 appearances in the Regionalliga Nordost, winning two Berlin Cups.

On 12 July 2019, Malembana signed a three-year contract with Bulgarian First League club Lokomotiv Plovdiv, after a successful trial period with the club. He made his debut a week later, coming on as a substitute for Parvizdzhon Umarbayev in second-half stoppage time of the league match against Slavia Sofia, which finished as a 3–2 home win. In February 2022, Malembana joined the other main "railwaymen" club in Bulgaria - Lokomotiv Sofia.

International career
Malembana was born in Germany to a Mozambican Malagasy father and German mother. He has stated his dream is to play for the Mozambique national team. He was already called up to represent the African country while he was a Berliner FC Dynamo player, but the head coach of the German side prevented him from going. He debuted with Mozambique in a 1–0 2022 FIFA World Cup qualification loss to Cameroon on 11 October 2021.

Honours
Berliner FC Dynamo
Berlin Cup: 2017, 2018

Lokomotiv Plovdiv
 Bulgarian Cup: 2019–20
 Bulgarian Supercup: 2020

References

External links
 
 

1995 births
Living people
People from Freital
Mozambican people of German descent
German people of Mozambican descent
Mozambican footballers
German footballers
Association football central defenders
Mozambique international footballers
Oberliga (football) players
Dynamo Dresden II players
Regionalliga players
Goslarer SC 08 players
Berliner FC Dynamo players
First Professional Football League (Bulgaria) players
PFC Lokomotiv Plovdiv players
Mozambican expatriate footballers
German expatriate footballers
Mozambican expatriate sportspeople in Bulgaria
German expatriate sportspeople in Bulgaria
Expatriate footballers in Bulgaria
Footballers from Saxony